Hospital Naval is a building in the Caballito section of Buenos Aires designed by architect Clorindo Testa in 1977. Serving Argentine Navy personnel and facing Parque Centenario, the institution was established in 1947, and its current, modernist building was inaugurated in 1981. The 30,000 m2 (320,000 ft²) hospital is one of the best-known examples of brutalist architecture in Argentina.

References

Hospitals in Buenos Aires
Brutalist architecture in Argentina
Hospitals established in 1947
Hospital buildings completed in 1981
Government buildings completed in 1981
1947 establishments in Argentina
Argentine Navy
Military hospitals
Naval medicine